The year 1969 in archaeology involved some significant events.

Excavations
 The Byzantine Fortress at Isthmia is excavated.
 In Iran, Bard-e Bal, a necropolis, is excavated by the Belgian archaeological mission, along the banks of the Garāb river (continue to 1970).
 In Cyprus, an unlooted tomb of the Cypro-Classic I period is excavated.
 At the Extramural Sanctuary of Demeter and Persephone at Cyrene, site ЕЮ/(Area 1), 1, 3, as a dump of the imperial period, predating the 3rd century, is excavated.
 Excavations at Habuba Kabira by the Deutsche Orient-Gesellschaft begin (continue to 1975).
 Excavations at Ekalte by the DO-G.
 Excavations at Salona, Yugoslavia, by an American team (continue to 1972).
 Excavations at Birka, Sweden, begin under Björn Ambrosiani.
 On the Isle of Wight, two barrows on Ashey Down are excavated.
 With a British expedition at Cambodunum, in Bavaria (Germany), an area to the north of the fort is excavated, during which several timber buildings are identified in a vicus settlement.
 In Ireland, the burial mound at Grannagh, near Ardrahan in County Galway (first excavated in 1916 by R.A.S. Macalister) is re-excavated in 1969 by Etienne Rynne.
 The Missouri River steamboat Bertrand is excavated, revealing the hull with cargo in the center, later removed.

Publications
 J. N. L. Myres - Anglo-Saxon Pottery and the Settlement of England.

Finds
 June - Blackfriars Ship II discovered by Peter Marsden in London.
 Ship remains at the Marsala Ship site off Sicily are discovered.
 Wreck of the VOC ship Amsterdam (lost on her maiden voyage in 1749) is exposed off Bulverhythe in the English Channel. 
 In Ireland, from the burial mound at Grannagh, finds included 10 glass beads (one of dumbbell-shape), 3 fragmentary bronze La Tène-type fibulae of rod-bow type, some bone beads or pins, and some items of iron.
 In Wuwei County, Gansu Province, Lanzhou, an artefact is excavated depicting a vigorous horse with long tail waving and head perking.
 In Australia, "Mungo Woman", first of the Lake Mungo remains, is discovered by Jim Bowler, one of the world's oldest cremations at around 24,000 years BP.

Miscellaneous
 January 10 - Historic American Engineering Record program founded by the National Park Service and the American Society of Civil Engineers.
 June - Schooner Alvin Clark (sunk 1864) is salvaged from Green Bay (Lake Michigan).

Deaths
 May 7 - Axel Boëthius (born 1889)

Archaeology
Archaeology
Archaeology by year